The Layton Oregon Short Line Railroad Station is a historic railroad depot in Layton, Utah. The depot was opened in 1912 alongside the tracks of the Oregon Short Line Railroad, which at that time was a subsidiary of (and later merged into) the Union Pacific Railroad. The depot was used for both freight and passenger traffic until the 1960s.

In 1972 the depot building was sold with the stipulation it be removed from the original site. The new owner moved the building approximately 1,200 feet to the southeast, flipping the original trackside of the building around to the east, but keeping the depot alongside the railroad tracks. The original site of the depot is just southeast of Layton's Veterans Park on Gentile Street. Following the move, the building housed a number of different businesses until 2010, when the Utah Department of Transportation (UDOT) purchased the building as part of the construction of a neighboring intersection. UDOT initially planned to demolish the building, but at the request of Layton City, it was decided to rehabilitate it instead. The building was sold and then restored in the years 2016–2017. It currently houses a Mexican food restaurant called Cafe Sabor.

The Layton Station of the Utah Transit Authority's commuter rail system FrontRunner is located next to the historic building. FrontRunner uses the same rail corridor in the area as the Oregon Short Line Railroad did when the depot was constructed in 1912.

References

External links

 NRHP Nomination Form
 1930 Sanborn Fire Insurance Map, showing the depot in its original location

Former railway stations in Utah
National Register of Historic Places in Davis County, Utah
Railway stations on the National Register of Historic Places in Utah
Railway stations in the United States opened in 1912
Former Union Pacific Railroad stations in Utah
Oregon Short Line Railroad